Rodez Cathedral is a Roman Catholic church located in town of Rodez, in the department of Aveyron in the Occitanie region of Southern France. The cathedral is a national monument and is the seat of the Bishopric of Rodez. The west front, of a military appearance and without a portal,  formerly was part of the city wall of Rodez. Notable elements include a Flamboyant Gothic and Renaissance tower (17th century), and a Renaissance rood screen and choir stalls (17th century).

History
Rodez was Christianized in the 4th–5th century AD, and the first mention of a cathedral dates from the Merovingian period, in around 516, though little is known of its features. On 16 February 1276, the bell tower and roof of the choir of this early church collapsed. The construction of a new cathedral was begun, likely led by the Bishop Raymont de Calmont d'Olt, and master builder Jean Deschamps. The cathedral's design was influenced by Clermont-Ferrand Cathedral and Limoges Cathedral as well as by the cathedrals Ile-de-France, an influence visible in features such as the blind arcades of the triforium and the strong sense of verticality. 

The first four-part rib vaults of the choir were installed, giving it a height of thirty meters, divided into three levels. The first chapel on the north side was finished in 1338. In the 14th and 15th centuries, the work was slowed by the Black Death and the Hundred Years War. Between 1366 and 1386 a new tower was constructed, at the northeast corner of the cathedral,  crowned with a spire of wood covered with lead. However, the timbers of the tower burned and destroyed the upper levels. It remained unfinished for more than a century.

In the 16th century, thanks to the efforts of Bishops Francois D'Estaing, who raised the funds, and Georges d'Armagnac, work resumed. The vaults of the nave were finally finished, and a new tower was constructed upon the two levels of the earlier tower. The new tower, the work of the master mason  Antoine Salvanh, was built between 1501 and 1529. The upper portions of the completed tower incorporated both Flamboyant Gothic features and elements of the new French Renaissance architecture.

Following the French Revolution, the cathedral was closed for worship and was used as a storage depot for gunpowder, before it was returned to the Church in the early 19th century. 
 
In 1792–98, Pierre Méchain and Jean-Baptiste Delambre used Rodez Cathedral as the central surveying point for their calculation of the circumference of the earth. This was used in the definition of the metre (see History of the metre).

Plans

Exterior  

The construction of the church began in about 1277, and commenced with the chevet, at the east end, flanked by an imposing square tower on the north side, which was built up only two levels.  Construction of the unfinished work resumed in the 16th century when Francois d'Estaing completed the north tower with a Flamboyant bell tower 87 meters high. The west front, with its own flamboyant decoration, was completed by Georges d'Armagnac between 1500 and 1562.

West Front 

The lower portion of the west front at Rodez,  the traditional entrance to Gothic cathedrals, is flat and plain, with narrow slit windows for defense and no large portal. It originally extended outside the city wall, and large doors or windows were avoided to prevent access by the attackers to the city.  The lower are made of reddish sandstone, in the Gothic style of northern France. The upper levels of the west front were constructed between 1500 and 1562 by Bishop Georges d'Armagnac.  The upper central vessel of the nave has a large rose window, while the two unfinished towers on either side are decorated with engaged columns. Above the rose window is a fronton in the new Renaissance style, the work of Jean Salvanh.

North Tower 

The highly flamboyant north bell tower, 87 meters high, is placed on the north side of the tower. It was commissioned by Bishop Francois D'Estaing and completed in `1526 by master builder Antoine Salvanh.  The tower is topped by a lantern which in turn is crowned by a statue of the Virgin Mary surrounded by four angels.

The  transept and portals 

Since the west front of the cathedral extended just outside the city walls, it did not have the traditional large portal on the west front. Instead, the entrances to the cathedral were on the north and south sides. In the sixteen century, A transept was constructed at the meeting point between the nave and choir, which reached out to the east and west and had very elaborate portals, topped by filled with sculpture, and further decorated with gables and pinnacles. Flamboyant rose windows were placed over the portals on the north and south transept.  Much of the sculpture was smashed during the French Revolution, but other elements survived and were restored.

Interior

Nave and Choir 

The nave and choir of the church are 101.57 meters long, 36.89 meters wide at the transept, and 30 meters high in the nave. The nave and choir are constructed with three levels, following the design of Ile-de-France cathedrals; massive pillars on the ground floor; a narrow triforium or passage above; and upper walls filled with windows. Slender columns run up the walls from the arcade pillars to support the four-part rib vaults.

Chapels 

The cathedral has a group of radiating chapels within the apse, at the east end, accessed by a semicircular passage or deambulatory. It also has a group of chapels placed alongside the nave. The Chapel of Reconciliation has Renaissance decoration preserved from other parts of the buildings.

Art and Decoration 

Rodez Cathedral is one of the few Gothic churches that retains a jubé or rood screen, placed between the choir and the nave. Most French rood screens were removed during the Renaissance, in response to a Vatican change in church doctrine intended to make the interior of churches more open and accessible to lay parishioners. The rood screen was installed in 1478, under Bishop Bertrandt de Chalencon.  In the 19th century, the choir screen lost most of its elaborate sculpture but otherwise was moved intact to its present location in the north transept.

The choir stalls were also installed in 1478, and display a rich assortment of carved decorations, particularly on the misercordiae, the folding seats against which the clergy could find support when they were required to stand for long periods of time. They are decorated with carved Biblical figures and scenes.

Stained glass 

The cathedral has a mixture of early windows, 19th-century windows, and a series of modern windows depicting, among others, the subjects, the creation of the Elements. In some windows, early glass has been combined with more modern settings.

The great organ 

The great organ is one of the famous features of the cathedral. The buffet was constructed in 1628 by Raymond Guimond de Périgueux to house an organ built by Vernohlles de Poitiers. The instrument was rebuilt in 1676 by Jean de Joyeux.  It was reconstructed again in 1902 by Charles Anneessens, then rebuilt once again in 1986 par Jean-Georges & Yves Koenig to return it to its earlier form under Jean de Joyeux Joyeuse en 1986. Both the buffet and the instrument are protected in the list of French historic monuments.

See also 
 Jean Salvanh
 Antoine Salvanh 
 List of Gothic Cathedrals in Europe
 French Gothic architecture

References

Bibliography

External links
 .
 La Cathédrale Notre-Dame et l'orgue, Rodez (France) - musiqueorguequebec.ca
 Visite virtuelle de la cathédrale de Rodez.
Visite de la Cathédrale - Paroisse Notre Dame de l'Assomption - Rodez - Aveyron (12)

Roman Catholic cathedrals in France
Fortified church buildings in France
Churches in Aveyron
Basilica churches in France
Gothic architecture in France
Monuments historiques of Aveyron